Ethan Benjamin Laird (born 5 August 2001) is an English professional footballer who plays as a right-back for EFL Championship club Queens Park Rangers, on loan from Premier League club Manchester United.

Laird is a graduate of Manchester United's youth system and made his first-team debut for the club in a UEFA Europa League game in November 2019. He has also spent time on loan at Milton Keynes Dons, Swansea City and AFC Bournemouth. In the 2021–22 season, he helped Bournemouth gain promotion to the Premier League by finishing as runners-up in the Championship.

Laird has played for England at under-17, under-18 and under-19 levels. He is also eligible to represent Jamaica at international level.

Club career

Manchester United

Laird joined Manchester United's youth system at the age of 10. He made his reserve team debut in a match against Swansea City on 18 March 2018. He signed his first professional contract with the club in October 2018, but less than two months later he suffered a long-term injury in a UEFA Youth League match at home to Young Boys, and made just two more appearances in 2018–19.

Laird graduated to the reserve team for the 2019–20 season, and scored in the team's opening match of their EFL Trophy campaign away to Rotherham United on 6 August 2019; however, he suffered another injury in a game against Reading on 16 August and was ruled out for two months. After returning to action, he was included in the 20-man travelling party for the first team's UEFA Europa League match away to Partizan on 24 October, but was not named in the 18-man squad for the match. After United qualified for the Europa League knockout phase, manager Ole Gunnar Solskjær took a squad mostly made up of youth team players to Kazakhstan for their away game against Astana on 28 November, and named Laird as one of three players to make their senior debuts in the match, along with Di'Shon Bernard and Dylan Levitt; the match finished as a 2–1 defeat.

Loan to Milton Keynes Dons
On 8 January 2021, Laird joined League One side Milton Keynes Dons on loan until the end of the 2020–21 season. He made his professional league debut for the club on 16 January 2021 in a 3–0 defeat away to Peterborough United.

Loan to Swansea City
On 16 August 2021, Laird joined EFL Championship club Swansea City on loan for the duration of the 2021–22 season, reuniting with former MK Dons manager Russell Martin.

Loan to AFC Bournemouth
On 6 January 2022, Laird joined AFC Bournemouth on a short-term loan deal until the end of the season.

Loan to Queens Park Rangers
On 15 August 2022, Laird joined Queens Park Rangers on loan until the end of the 2022–23 season. On 30 August 2022, Laird scored his first senior goal with the second in an impressive 3–1 victory over Hull City, converting a cross from opposite full-back Kenneth Paal.

International career
Laird is eligible to represent England or Jamaica at international level. He has played youth international football for England at under-17, under-18 and under-19 levels. He was a member of the under-17 squad that hosted the 2018 UEFA European Under-17 Championship.

Career statistics

Honours
AFC Bournemouth
Championship runner-up: 2021–22

References

External links
Profile at ManUtd.com

2001 births
Living people
English footballers
Association football defenders
Manchester United F.C. players
Milton Keynes Dons F.C. players
Swansea City A.F.C. players
AFC Bournemouth players
England youth international footballers
English people of Jamaican descent
Premier League players
English Football League players
Black British sportspeople